Christopher John Snowdon is a British author and freelance journalist. He has written for Spiked magazine, The Daily Telegraph and The Spectator among other publications. He is particularly known as a vocal opponent of government intervention in areas such as tobacco, alcohol and obesity. Snowdon is also Head of Lifestyle Economics at the Institute of Economic Affairs.

Snowdon was born in North Yorkshire in 1976 and studied history at Lancaster University, graduating in 1998. He now lives in Sussex with his wife and daughter.

His first book, Velvet Glove, Iron Fist (2009), is a history of anti-smoking activity from the fifteenth century to the present day.

Books
 Polemics, Little Dice, 2020 
 Killjoys: A Critique of Paternalism, Institute of Economic Affairs, 2017
 The Art of Suppression: Pleasure, Panic and Prohibition since 1800 Little Dice, 2011 
 The Spirit Level Delusion: Fact-checking the Left's New Theory of Everything, Democracy Institute/Little Dice, 2010 
 Velvet Glove, Iron Fist: A History of Anti-Smoking, Little Dice, 2009

References

Living people
1976 births
British writers
British libertarians
Alumni of Lancaster University